, son of Moronori with Imperial Prince Moriyoshi’s daughter and adopted son of Fusazane, was a kugyō or Japanese court noble of the Kamakura period (1185–1333). He held a regent position kampaku in 1342. He married Oomiya Suehira’s daughter. Tsunenori was his adopted son.

References
 

1315 births
1349 deaths
Fujiwara clan
Kujō family